Asaphus kowalewskii is one of the 35 species of trilobites of the genus Asaphus (this particular species is sometimes placed in its own genus, Neoasaphus). Fossils of this species are popular among collectors because of their prominent stalked eyes (termed "peduncles"), many an inch or more in length.

In the Ordovician period, an inland sea formed in what is now Eastern Europe.  The sea contained a remarkably diverse trilobite fauna. Over a dozen species of Asaphus developed in this sea, with many species, including unrelated species, developing long eyestalks in various lengths. That so many species of trilobite developed eyestalks suggests that they were trying to overcome increased turbidity, or there was some sort of massive selective pressure leading these trilobites to bury themselves in the substrate up to their eyes. This species may have lain in wait buried in a benthic layer of loose debris or sediment with only its periscope eyestalks protruding above, looking out for danger or prey.

The fossils of this species are found only in the middle Ordovician deposits of the Volkhov River region near Saint Petersburg, Russia.

References

 N. Lawrow (1856). Verhandlungen der Kaiserlichen mineralogischen Gesellschaft zu St. Petersburg Jahr 1855–1856.
 Some of the information in this article was taken from the website A Guide to the Orders of Trilobites by Sam Gon III.
 Ivantsov A.U., Paleontological Journal, Vol. 37, Suppl 3, 2003.

Asaphidae
Ordovician arthropods
Extinct animals of Russia